Cathedral of the Immaculate Heart of Mary, Datong  is a Roman Catholic cathedral located in Datong, Shanxi, China.

History 
Construction of the Cathedral of the Immaculate Heart of Mary, designed by Franciscan missionaries from Italy, commenced in 1889 and was completed in 1891. It was burned by a catastrophic fire in 1900 during the Boxer Uprising, causing many casualties in the Christian community in the area. It was restored in 1906 in a neoclassical architecture style.

The Roman Catholic Diocese of Datong was set up in 1922 and came under the leadership of the CICM Missionaries.

During the Cultural Revolution, the church was severely damaged by the Red Guards, while Christians were hunted by the Communists. Both bell towers collapsed. And the church was used as a workshop. It underwent two renovations, respectively in 1982 and 2006.

References

Further reading 
 
 

Roman Catholic cathedrals in China
1906 establishments in China
Churches completed in 1906
Roman Catholic churches in Shanxi
Buildings and structures in Datong
Neoclassical church buildings in China